Dentition analyses are systems of tooth and jaw measurement used in orthodontics to understand arch space and predict any malocclusion (mal-alignment of the teeth and the bite). Example systems of dentition analysis are listed below.

Permanent dentition (adult teeth) analysis
 Maxillary dentition (upper teeth)
 Pont's Analysis
 Linder Harth Index
 Korkhaus Analysis 
 Arch Perimeter Analysis 
 Mandibular dentition (lower teeth) 
 Ashley Howe's Analysis
 Carey's Analysis
 Both Arches (upper and lower teeth)
 Bolton Analysis

Mixed dentition analysis
 Moyer's Mixed Dentition Analysis
 Tanaka and Johnston Analysis
 Radiographic Analysis
 Ballard and Willie Analysis
 Huckaba's Analysis
 Staley Kerber Analysis
 Hixon and Old Father Analysis
 Tweed's analysis (cast + cephalometric)
 Total space analysis (cast + cephalometric + soft tissue)

Dental arch analysis
 Intermolar Width - It is the distance between the mesiobuccal cusp tip points of the first permanent molars 
 Intercanine Width - It is the distance between the tip of the cusp from canine to canine. 
 Arch Length - It is the distance from the line perpendicular to the mesiobuccal cusp tips of the first permanent molars to the midpoint between the mesioincisal points of the central incisors. 
 Arch Perimeter - It is the distance from mesial contact of a permanent molar on one side to the mesial contact of permanent molar on the other side, with the line connecting the buccal/incisor tip points in the intervening teeth.

Others 
 Little's Irregularity Index
 Bolton analysis

References

Orthodontics